Highway 4 is a road in Åland that starts in Finström and ends in Geta. The length of the road is 21 kilometers. Unlike other Åland highways, its starting point is not in Mariehamn, nor does it pass through Mariehamn.

The only attraction along the highway is Geta Church.

Route 
The road passes through the following localities:
Finström
Saltvik
Geta

See also
Transport in Åland
Finnish national road 4

Source

References

Roads in Åland